Jamame District is a district in the southern Lower Juba (Jubbada Hoose) region of Somalia. Its capital lies at Jamame. The district is primarily inhabited and also dominated by Bimal sub-clan of Dir, well known for leading a resistance against the Europian invaders in Southern Somalia

References

External links
 Districts of Somalia
 Administrative Map of Jamame District

Districts of Somalia

Lower Juba